Bric Ghinivert or Eiminàl (3,037 m a.s.l.) is a mountain of the Cottian Alps located in Italy.

Geography 
The mountain is the highest elevation of the water divide between Val Troncea (West) and Valle Germanasca (East). Following northwards the ridge Colle del Beth (Beth Pass, 2783 m a.s.l.) divides Bric Ghinivert from Bric di Mezzogiorno (2,986  m a.s.l.), while going South Colle di Ghinivert (2,831 m a.s.l.) separates it from Monte Peolioso (2,886 m a.s.l.). Administratively the mountain is on the border between Pragelato and Massello municipalities (comuni). On Bric Ghinivert top stands a summit cross.

SOIUSA classification 
According to SOIUSA (International Standardized Mountain Subdivision of the Alps) the mountain can be classified in the following way:
 main part = Western Alps
 major sector = North Western Alps
 section = Cottian Alps
 subsection = Alpi del Monginevro
 supergroup = Catena Bucie-Grand Queyron-Orsiera
 group = Gruppo Queyron-Albergian-Sestrière
 subgroup = Sottogruppo Ghinivert-Albergian
 code = I/A-4.II-A.2.b

Nature conservation 
The western face of the mountain belongs to the Parco naturale Val Troncea.

Access to the summit 

Easy routes to Bric Ghinivert start either from Val Troncea or from Val Germanasca; in both cases they do not require alpinistic skills but some scrambling. In the Italian scale of hiking difficulty is rated EE (Escursionisti Esperti, namely suitable for expert hikers). A mountain hut managed by the nature Park is available for hikers on Colle del Beth previous arrangements with the park staff.

History 
Around the mountain are still identifiable remains of ancient copper mines and the connected miner's village. Aexplanatory boards created  by the Nature Park outline the site history.

Notes

References 
 Istituto Geografico Militare (IGM) official maps of Italy, 1:25,000 and 1:100,000 scale, on-line version
 Istituto Geografico Centrale – Carta dei sentieri e dei rifugi scala 1:50.000 n. 1 Valli di Susa, Chisone e Germanasca
 Istituto Geografico Centrale – Carta dei sentieri e dei rifugi scala 1:25.000 n.105 Sestriere, Claviere, San Sicario, Prali

External links 

 Panoramics from the mountain

Alpine three-thousanders
Mountains of the Alps
Mountains of Piedmont